Branchiostegus argentatus is a species of marine ray-finned fish, a tilefish belonging to the family Malacanthidae. It is from the East and South China seas.

References

Malacanthidae
Taxa named by Georges Cuvier
Fish described in 1830